Jean-Baptiste Blanchard (12 October 1731, at Tourteron in the department of Ardennes – 15 June 1797)  was a French Jesuit and educator, one of the contemporary opponents of Rosseau.

Blanchard was born in Tourteron in the department of Ardennes. In 1746 he entered the Society of Jesus, and later was professor at Metz, Verdun, and Pont-à-Mousson. At the time of the suppression of the Society he changed his name of Duchesne to that of Abbé Blanchard, under which his works were published. He left the order, however, in 1762, before it was suppressed, retired to Belgium, and for seven years remained near Namur, occupied with pedagogical questions. He wrote "Le temple des Muses fabulistes" (Liège, 1776, 2 vols.) and "L'Ecole des mœurs" (Namur and Paris, 1775, 2 vols.). The latter work was first published without the author's name under the title, "Les poète des mœurs, ou les maximes de la sagesse..." (1771), and later was reprinted several times with the title "Maximes des l'honnête homme, ou les poète des mœurs."

Blanchard's main work was published after his death by Bruyset, "Préceptes pour l'éducation des deux sexes à l'usage des families chrétiennes" (Lyon, 1803, 2 vols.); a new edition in 1807 was entitled "Education chrétienne à l'usage de l'un et de l'autre sexe." Blanchard adopts to Christian education the principle found in Rousseau's "Emile." In the work there is little originality; yet, besides judiciously chosen questions, we find very useful suggestions and good criticisms of Rousseau's views. It is divided into three parts: physical education, moral education, and education of girls. Great importance is attached to physical culture, health, hygiene of the whole organism, and of the special sense-organs. Useful rules are given for the formation of intellect, feelings, and will. Good pronunciation and reading are insisted on.

Blanchard rightly rejects the principal of negative education advocated by Rousseau. It would be very harmful to wait until reason develops to make the child exercise it; on the contrary, it must be developed by proper exercise and under proper guidance. To start for a long journey, he says, the traveler does not wait until the sun is high in the sky, but rather profits by the first rays of light; so it must be with the child. As to the education of women, Blanchard's views seem rather narrow today. Woman is made for dependence. Her instruction must be limited to a few elementary notions; Fénelon's principals and the "Avis d'une mère à sa fille" of Madame de Lambert, which Blanchard reproduces, must form the basis of her moral education.

References

18th-century French Jesuits
1731 births
1797 deaths
French educators